The Twin Mounds Archeological District, also known as Wekiva 7 (8Or457) & Wekiva 8 (8Or459), is a U.S. historic district east of Sorrento, Florida.

It is located on the west bank of the Wekiva River, seven miles south of its confluence with the St. Johns River. On January 19, 1992, it was added to the U.S. National Register of Historic Places.

References

External links
 Orange County listings at National Register of Historic Places
 Orange County listings at Florida's Office of Cultural and Historical Programs

Archaeological sites in Florida
National Register of Historic Places in Orange County, Florida
Historic districts on the National Register of Historic Places in Florida
Woodland period
Mounds in Florida